Andrés Narvarte Pimentel (1781–March 31, 1853) was the president of Venezuela as interim caretaker (1836–1837).

Biography

First Period (1835)
As Vice President of the Republic, Andrés Navarte assumed executive power between 20 January 1835 (when the new Legislative Assembly was finalised) and 9 February 1835 (when José María Vargas was elected as President).

Second Period (1836-1837)
The 55-year-old jurist returned to power after the resignation of Jose Maria Vargas, and as the vice president of Venezuela he was left with executive authority between 24 April 1836 and 20 January 1837 (nine months in total).

References 
  Official biography 

People from La Guaira
19th-century Venezuelan lawyers
Presidents of Venezuela
Vice presidents of Venezuela
Central University of Venezuela alumni
1781 births
1853 deaths
Venezuelan people of Spanish descent
Conservative Party (Venezuela) politicians